Jia Wenpeng (born August 3, 1978) is a former Chinese footballer who spent the majority of his career for Bayi FC before joining Shanghai Shenhua, Chongqing Lifan and Guangzhou Pharmaceutical where he was released at the end of 2008 season.

Club career
Jia Wenpeng began his professional football career in 1996 with Bayi FC where he was a loyal member of the team until the end of the 2003 league season saw the club relegated and then later disbanded at the end of the campaign. He would join top-tier club Shanghai Shenhua in 2004, however he did not play well at the club and was released at the end of 2004 season. Jia would then move to Chongqing Lifan in 2005 for 2.4 million Yuan and then later transferred to second-tier club Guangzhou Pharmaceutical along with teammate Zhou Lin in 2007. While at Guangzhou he would play a small part as the team won the division title, however while he gained more playing time the following season he was released in 2008.

Management career
Jia Wenpeng was named as the head coach of China League Two side Shenyang Dongjin on December 4, 2016.

Honours

Club
Guangzhou Pharmaceutical
China League One: 2007

References

External links
Player profile at Sodasoccer.com

1978 births
Living people
Chinese footballers
Chinese football managers
Footballers from Dalian
Bayi Football Team players
Shanghai Shenhua F.C. players
Chongqing Liangjiang Athletic F.C. players
Guangzhou F.C. players
Chinese Super League players
China League One players
Association football midfielders